"Across the Universe" is a 1969 song by the Beatles.

Across the Universe may also refer to:
Across the Universe (album), a 1990 rock album by Trip Shakespeare
Across the Universe (EP), a 2020 EP by D-Crunch
Across the Universe (film), a 2007 musical film based on songs by the Beatles
Across the Universe (novel), a series of novels by Beth Revis
Across the Universe (Star Trek), a 1999 Star Trek novel
"Across the Universe" (Holly Johnson song), 1991
Across the Universe (message), an interstellar radio message

See also
A Cross the Universe (disambiguation)